Gray's Sporting Journal is a magazine dedicated to the pursuit of outdoor recreation, with an emphasis on hunting and fishing. It is a consciously literary publication, using a "blind reader" to select articles, poems, and stories for publication. The blind reader receives only the text of the submitted work, not the name of the author, thus theoretically preventing publication of works based on fame only.

History and profile
Gray's Sporting Journal was established in 1975. The magazine is published seven times a year. The headquarters is in Augusta, Georgia. It employs perfect binding and always features a work of outdoor art on its cover. Gray's includes poetry, lengthy works of fiction, fine art, and photo journals in the same issue. The magazine is part of MCC Magazines, LLC, a subsidiary of Morris Communications, which also owns publications such as American Angler, Fly Tyer, and Saltwater Fly Fishing. The company acquired Gray's Sporting Journal in 1989.

In July 2017 Russ Lumpkin became the editor-in-chief of Gray's Sporting Journal. Known for its photography as well as its fiction, it has published the work of such writers as E. Annie Proulx, Rick Bass, Pete Fromm, Ron Carlson, and C.B. Bernard.

Regular features
"Shooting," with Terry Wieland, features a different aspect of the shooting sports in each issue.

"Gray's Best," a feature published yearly, selects the best outdoor equipment across the range of sports Gray's covers.

References

External links
 Gray's Sporting Journal Online

1975 establishments in Georgia (U.S. state)
Poetry magazines published in the United States
Fly fishing literature
Hunting and fishing magazines
Magazines established in 1975
Magazines published in Georgia (U.S. state)
Morris Communications
Recreational fishing